Nader Moradi (born 21 September 1982) is an Iranian Paralympic powerlifter. He represented Iran at the 2012 Summer Paralympics and he won the gold medal in the men's 60 kg (130 lb) event.

He won the gold medal in the men's 72 kg (159 lb) event at the 2017 World Para Powerlifting Championships held in Mexico City, Mexico. At the 2019 World Para Powerlifting Championships held in Nur-Sultan, Kazakhstan, he won the silver medal in this event.

References

External links 
 

1982 births
Living people
Place of birth missing (living people)
Paralympic powerlifters of Iran
Paralympic medalists in powerlifting
Paralympic gold medalists for Iran
Powerlifters at the 2012 Summer Paralympics
Medalists at the 2012 Summer Paralympics
21st-century Iranian people